Wichhu Qullu (Aymara jichu, wichhu stipa ichu, qullu mountain, "ichu mountain", also spelled Wichu Kkollu) is a  mountain in the Andes in Bolivia. It is located in the Oruro Department, Cercado Province, Paria Municipality (formerly Soracachi). Wichhu Qullu lies southwest of Wayllani and southeast of Kuntur Ikiña.

References 

Mountains of Oruro Department